Mario Martinez may refer to:

Arts and entertainment
Mario Martinez (painter) (born 1953), contemporary abstract painter
Mario Iván Martínez (born 1962), Mexican actor

Sportspeople

Association football
Mario Martínez (footballer, born 1985), Spanish football midfielder
Mario Martínez (footballer, born 1989), Honduran football attacking midfielder

Other sports
Mario Martinez (weightlifter) (1957–2018), American Olympic weightlifter
Mario Martinez (tennis) (born 1961), Bolivian tennis player
Mario Martínez (boxer) (born 1965), former Mexican boxer

Other
Mario Aburto Martínez (born 1971), Mexican assassin